Tolchard is a surname. Notable people with the surname include:

Jeffrey Tolchard (born 1944), English cricketer and footballer
Ray Tolchard (1953–2004), English cricketer
Roger Tolchard (born 1946), English cricketer
Sam Tolchard (born 1989), English lawn and indoor bowler
Sophie Tolchard (born 1991), English lawn bowler